Tritia frigens is a species of sea snail, a marine gastropod mollusk in the family Nassariidae, the Nassa mud snails or dog whelks.

Description
The shell grows to a length of 15 mm.

Distribution
This species occurs in European waters and in the Atlantic Ocean off Morocco and Mauritania.

References

 Cernohorsky W. O. (1984). Systematics of the family Nassariidae (Mollusca: Gastropoda). Bulletin of the Auckland Institute and Museum 14: 1–356.
 Adam W. & Knudsen J. 1984. Révision des Nassariidae (Mollusca : Gastropoda Prosobranchia) de l’Afrique occidentale. Bulletin de l'Institut Royal des Sciences Naturelles de Belgique 55(9): 1-95, 5 pl.
 Gofas, S.; Le Renard, J.; Bouchet, P. (2001). Mollusca, in: Costello, M.J. et al. (Ed.) (2001). European register of marine species: a check-list of the marine species in Europe and a bibliography of guides to their identification. Collection Patrimoines Naturels, 50: pp. 180–213

External links
 

frigens
Gastropods described in 1878